Sloan Creek may refer to:

Sloan Creek (Missouri), a stream in Cape Girardeau County
Sloan Creek (Washington), a tributary of the North Fork Sauk River